In mathematics, the Gershgorin circle theorem may be used to bound the spectrum of a square matrix. It was first published by the Soviet mathematician Semyon Aronovich Gershgorin in 1931.  Gershgorin's name has been transliterated in several different ways, including Geršgorin, Gerschgorin, Gershgorin, Hershhorn, and Hirschhorn.

Statement and proof
Let  be a complex  matrix, with entries . For  let  be the sum of the absolute values of the non-diagonal entries in the -th row:  

Such a disc is called a Gershgorin disc.

Theorem. Every eigenvalue of  lies within at least one of the Gershgorin discs 

Proof. Since , in particular we take the ith component of that equation to get: 

 

Taking  to the other side:

 

Therefore, applying the triangle inequality and recalling that  based on how we picked i,

 

Corollary. The eigenvalues of A must also lie within the Gershgorin discs Cj corresponding to the columns of A.

Proof. Apply the Theorem to AT while recognizing that the eigenvalues of the transpose are the same as those of the original matrix.

Example. For a diagonal matrix, the Gershgorin discs coincide with the spectrum. Conversely, if the Gershgorin discs coincide with the spectrum, the matrix is diagonal.

Discussion
One way to interpret this theorem is that if the off-diagonal entries of a square matrix over the complex numbers have small norms, the eigenvalues of the matrix cannot be "far from" the diagonal entries of the matrix. Therefore, by reducing the norms of off-diagonal entries one can attempt to approximate the eigenvalues of the matrix. Of course, diagonal entries may change in the process of minimizing off-diagonal entries.

In the matrix
 
This is however just a happy coincidence; if working through the steps of the proof one finds that it in each eigenvector is the first element that is the largest (every eigenspace is closer to the first axis than to any other axis), so the theorem only promises that the disc for row 1 (whose radius can be twice the sum of the other two radii) covers all three eigenvalues.

Strengthening of the theorem
If one of the discs is disjoint from the others then it contains exactly one eigenvalue. If however it meets another disc it is possible that it contains no eigenvalue (for example,  or ). In the general case the theorem can be strengthened as follows:

Theorem: If the union of k discs is disjoint from the union of the other n − k discs then the former union contains exactly k and the latter n − k eigenvalues of A.

Proof: Let D be the diagonal matrix with entries equal to the diagonal entries of A and let

 

Obviously , and assume  lies in the union of the n-k discs. Then , so there exists  such that . But this means  lies outside the Gershgorin discs, which is impossible. Therefore  lies in the union of the k discs, and the theorem is proven.

Remarks:
 The continuity of  should be understood in the sense of topology. It is sufficient to show that the roots (as a point in space ) is continuous function of its coefficients. Note that the inverse map that maps roots to coefficients is described by Vieta's formulas (note for Characteristic polynomial ) which can be proved an open map. This proves the roots as a whole is a continuous function of its coefficients.
 Individual eigenvalue  could merge with other eigenvalue(s) or appeared from a splitting of previous eigenvalue. This may confuse people and questioning the concept of continuous. However, when viewing from the space of eigenvalue set , the trajectory is still a continuous curve although not necessarily smooth everywhere.

Added Remark:
 The proof given above is arguably (in)correct......  There are two types of continuity concerning eigenvalues: (1) each individual eigenvalue is a usual continuous function (such a representation does exist on a real interval but may not exist on a complex domain), (2) eigenvalues are continuous as a whole in the topological sense (a mapping from the matrix space with metric induced by a norm to unordered tuples, i.e., the quotient space of C^n under permutation equivalence with induced metric). Whichever continuity is used in a proof of the Gerschgorin disk theorem, it should be justified that the sum of algebraic multiplicities of eigenvalues remains unchanged on each connected region. A proof using the argument principle of complex analysis requires no eigenvalue continuity of any kind. For a brief discussion and clarification, see.

Application
The Gershgorin circle theorem is useful in solving matrix equations of the form Ax = b for x where b is a vector and A is a matrix with a large condition number.

In this kind of problem, the error in the final result is usually of the same order of magnitude as the error in the initial data multiplied by the condition number of A. For instance, if b is known to six decimal places and the condition number of A is 1000 then we can only be confident that x is accurate to three decimal places. For very high condition numbers, even very small errors due to rounding can be magnified to such an extent that the result is meaningless.

It would be good to reduce the condition number of A. This can be done by preconditioning: A matrix P such that P ≈ A−1 is constructed, and then the equation PAx = Pb is solved for x. Using the exact inverse of A would be nice but finding the inverse of a matrix is something we want to avoid because of the computational expense. 

Now, since PA ≈ I where I is the identity matrix, the eigenvalues of PA should all be close to 1. By the Gershgorin circle theorem, every eigenvalue of PA lies within a known area and so we can form a rough estimate of how good our choice of P was.

Example 
Use the Gershgorin circle theorem to estimate the eigenvalues of:

Starting with row one, we take the element on the diagonal, aii as the center for the disc.  We then take the remaining elements in the row and apply the formula:

 

to obtain the following four discs:
 

The eigenvalues are  9.8218,  8.1478,  1.8995, −10.86. Note that this is a (column) diagonally dominant matrix: . This means that most of the matrix is in the diagonal, which explains why the eigenvalues are so close to the centers of the circles, and the estimates are very good. For a random matrix, we would expect the eigenvalues to be substantially further from the centers of the circles.

See also
 For matrices with non-negative entries, see Perron–Frobenius theorem.
 Doubly stochastic matrix
 Hurwitz matrix
 Joel Lee Brenner
 Metzler matrix
 Muirhead's inequality
 Bendixson's inequality
 Schur–Horn theorem

References

 .
 . (Errata).
 . 1st ed., Prentice Hall, 1962.
 .

External links

 Eric W. Weisstein. "Gershgorin Circle Theorem." From MathWorld—A Wolfram Web Resource. 
 Semyon Aranovich Gershgorin biography at  MacTutor

Theorems in algebra
Linear algebra
Matrix theory
Articles containing proofs